The College of Applied Sciences, Adoor is an institution under the Institute of Human Resources and Development. It was established in 1994. The college is affiliated to the University of Kerala.

The college offers five undergraduate courses and two postgraduate courses and the introduction of Mcom is expected during the next academic year (2014–15). Along with the mainstream courses the college conducts an Institute of Human Resources and Development course. The project centre provides an opportunity to pursue project works and research attempts.

Courses 
It offers courses in electronics and computer science. The number of students intake per year in the respective courses is given in brackets.

 Bsc Electronics (50)
 BCom Computer Application (60)
 Bsc Computer Science (50)
 BBA (40)
 BCA (40)
 BA English (40)
 Msc Computer Science (20)
 Msc Electronics (20)
 PGDCA (40)
 DDT and PM (40)
 CHM & Networking

Organizations and clubs
The following clubs and organizations are available:
 Film club
Science and Environment Association (SEA)
Sports Club
Arts Club
National Service Scheme (NSS) unit
Ham Radio Club
 The Ham radio club under Science and Environment Association (SEA) has the credit of organizing interstate HAM Expo-‘98 and exhibition. A placement cell is also functioning in the campus.

See also
 Kerala University
 Institute of Human Resources Development
 Adoor

References

External links
Institute of Human Resource Development

Arts and Science colleges in Kerala
Universities and colleges in Pathanamthitta district
Colleges affiliated to the University of Kerala
Educational institutions established in 1994
1994 establishments in Kerala